AAFI may refer to:

 All American Foods, Inc., food ingredient manufacturer, USA
 Amateur Athletic Federation of India, former name of the Athletics Federation of India
 Association of Indonesia Futsal Academy (Indonesian: Asosiasi Akademi Futsal Indonesia), sport association for futsal
 Australians Against Further Immigration, former political party, Australia